Jacques Goosen is a South African rugby union player for the  in the Currie Cup. His regular position is hooker.

Goosen was named in the  side for the 2022 Currie Cup Premier Division.

References

South African rugby union players
Living people
Rugby union hookers
Western Province (rugby union) players
2001 births
Rugby union players from East London, Eastern Cape